Enlightenment, also known simply as E, is a compositing window manager for the X Window System. Since version 20, Enlightenment is also a Wayland compositor. Enlightenment developers have referred to it as "the original eye-candy window manager."

Enlightenment includes functions to provide a graphical shell and can be used in conjunction with programs written for GNOME or KDE. When used together with the Enlightenment Foundation Libraries (EFL), Enlightenment can refer to an entire desktop environment.

History 
The first version of Enlightenment was released by Rasterman (Carsten Haitzler) in 1997.

Version 0.17, also referred to as E17, was in development for 12 years starting in December 2000 until 21 December 2012 when it was officially released as stable. During the development period it was also referred to as DR17 (Development Release 17). It is a complete rewrite on DR16 and was designed to be a full-fledged desktop shell, based on the new Enlightenment Foundation Libraries (EFL).

E16 itself is still in active development that runs independently of E17, reaching the 1.0 milestone in 2009 (1.0.27 as of 2023).

Bodhi Linux was built around the Enlightenment 17 desktop, but forked it to create the Moksha desktop. Elive Linux also used a fork of E17 as its main desktop environment until 2019, when the 3.7 series was released.

The current version is E25.

Version history

E16

E16 provides features that you don't even see in many "advanced" desktop environments to this day. It allows the user to create a grid of workspaces known as "virtual desktops". Switching between them is achieved by hurling the mouse cursor to the edge of the screen, after which the desktop appears to slide across to reveal the next. All the desktops are connected, meaning that if a window is too big for the screen size you can go to the adjacent desktops to find the rest of it. You can have up to 8 by 8 desktops in a single grid, and up to 32 grids are possible (each can have a different background), making 2048 possible workspaces. Users can enable a sort of "map" of the desktops, called the pager, in case they get lost. It also provided the ability to put windows in groups (so they can be removed, resized, closed, etc all together), "iconification" which is similar to minimizing but are stored in "iconboxes" that can be moved, the ability to change the type of or remove completely the borders and title bars, advanced keybinding settings to allow use of Enlightenment solely with a keyboard (e16keyedit is a GUI program simplifying this process), a scriptable command-line interface that works with most if not all of E's features, and (with newer versions) a compositor with effects such as fading and transparency,

One of the aims of the window manager is to be as configurable as possible, and to this end, it includes customization dialogs for focus settings, window movement, resizing, grouping and placement settings, audio, multiple desktop, desktop background, pager, tooltip and autoraise settings. It also includes a special effects dialog, with two effects, one of which being a desktop 'ripple' effect.

E17 

E17 is fully themeable with both a menu-based and command-line theme-changing interface. It boasts a built-in file manager, adds icons to the desktop (for example, anything in the user's Desktop folder will show up), and a virtual desktop grid feature similar to that of E16. It also has a modular design, enabling it to load external modules. Examples of available modules are the Pager, the iBar (a sort of taskbar), an iBox holding minimized applications, a dock, a compositor, and more. E17 also adds one or more shelves to manage gadget placement and appearance. Animated and interactive desktop backgrounds, menu items, iBar items, and desktop widgets are also possible, as are window shading, iconification, maximizing, sticky settings, customizable key bindings, internationalization, and a screenshot menu. Finally, E17 conforms to all needed standards (NetWM, ICCCM, XDG, and so on).

E17's data files (such as configurations and themes), unlike E16 (which uses JSON) are in a binary format, making them significantly faster than their JSON counterparts.

E21 
 Greatly improved Wayland support
 New gadget infrastructure
 Wizard improvements
 Video backgrounds

E22 
 Greatly improved Wayland support
 Improvements to new gadget infrastructure
 Added a sudo/ssh askpass utility GUI
 Meson build system
 Tiling policy improvements
 Integrated per-window volume controls

E23 
 New padded screenshot option
 Meson build now is the build system
 Music Control now supports rage MPRIS dbus protocol
 Add Bluez5 support with totally new and redone module and gadget
 Add dpms option to turn it off or on
 Alt-tab window switcher allows moving of windows while alt-tabbing
 Many bug fixes, compile warning fixes, etc.
 Massive improvements to Wayland support

E24 

 New and improved shot module with editor and cropper
 Reduced number of setuid tools (merged many into single system tool)
 External monitor backlight and brightness controls via (lib)ddctil
 Improved resolution of EFM thumbnails to 256 × 256 by default
 New and improved crash handling guru meditation
 Restarts are now seamless with fade in and out and zero glitches
 Wallpaper import generates multiple resolutions for better efficiency
 Regularly malloc_trim if available to keep mem down
 All restarts are now handled by enlightenment_start, not e itself
 Enforce pointer lock to screen in X to stop pointer out-of-bounds
 Pager plain is gone  use the regular “miniature preview” pager
 Music control auto-runs your selected media player if not there
 Handle exception for steam games to find the right desktop file
 Polkit auth agent support as new core module  no extra daemons
 Drop comp fast effects  Should be edje transition factor plus theme tags
 Easier config of specific desktop wallpaper straight from pager
 Startup should be smoother with IO prefetch thread
 New special blanking timeout for when locked that can be shorter
 Bluez4 gone now as Bluez5 is done and working fine
 Down to zero outstanding coverity issues
 The usual batches of bug fixes and minor improvements

Release history 

Legacy sources

Developers 
 Principal
 Carsten "Rasterman" Haitzler: lead developer
 Kim "kwo" Woelders: E16 maintainer
 Hisham "CodeWarrior" Mardam Bey
 Christopher "devilhorns" Michael
 Mike "zmike" Blumenkrantz
 Inactive
 Geoff "Mandrake" Harrison

See also 

 Terminology (software)
 Comparison of X window managers
 Enlightenment Foundation Libraries
 Bodhi Linux
 OpenGEU

References

External links 

 
 Official website for older e16
 Sources(git)
 Operating-systems distribution status
Elive Linux's fork of E17

1997 software
3D GUIs

Free desktop environments
Freedesktop.org
Free X window managers
Software that uses Meson
Software using the BSD license
Wayland compositors